Panoli is a village in the Ankleshwar Tehsil of Bharuch district in the Indian state of Gujarat.

Location
Panoli is based between 21.5310601 latitude and 72.9637728 longitude. It is based in the Ankleshwar Tehsil, with the city of Ankleshwar being  to the north. The major cities nearby are Surat and Bharuch. However, the most important method of transport is the western railway, which is connected by the Panoli station.

Local Economy
The land around the village is Rich Black Cotton Soil although large parts of the land lay barren. Most of the locals are involved in traditional industries.

Industries
The Southwestern part of Panoli is a Gujarat Industrial Development Corporation estate. The industrial estate will have direct access to the Port of Dahej and Hazira Port.

Education

School and Islamic center

 The Sarvajanik High School
 Madresa Muhammadiya Arabiyah
 Madresa Hayatussalihat Trust of School and Madresa
 Madresa Jamiah Hamidiah
 Public school, which located near at panoli gidc

Nearby colleges
 Arts & Commerce College Of Sarbhan, Sarbhan
 J M Shah Jambusar, Tankari Bhagol Jambusar
 Shri Manubhai Rambhai Amin B.Ed College at Bayad Road Pahadiya, Velapura – 382315; Taluk: Dahegam; District: Gandhinagar 
 Shri Laxminarayandev College Of Pharmacy, Tulsidham Jhadeshwar Road, Bharuch
 Mahamandleshwar Shri Krishnanandji Law College, Bharuch District.

See also 
 Gulf of Khambhat
 Hansot
 South Gujarat

References

Villages in Bharuch district